Alva P. Loiselle (July 4, 1910 – December 22, 2005) was a justice of the Connecticut Supreme Court from 1971 to 1980.

Born in Willimantic to Heliodore and Mary Loiselle, he attended local schools and graduated from the University of Connecticut in 1934 and the University of Connecticut School of Law in 1943. He was a judge of various Connecticut state courts beginning in 1952.

the University of Connecticut School of Law hosts an annual moot court tournament for first year law students, known as the Alva P. Loiselle Moot Court Competition.

References

Justices of the Connecticut Supreme Court
1910 births
2005 deaths
University of Connecticut alumni
University of Connecticut School of Law alumni
People from Willimantic, Connecticut
20th-century American judges